Veijo Olavi Niemi (born 4 June 1954 in Lempäälä) is a Finnish politician currently serving in the Parliament of Finland for the Finns Party at the Pirkanmaa constituency.

References

1954 births
Living people
People from Lempäälä
Finns Party politicians
Members of the Parliament of Finland (2019–23)